Juan de Jáuregui (1562 – March 18, 1582) was killed trying to assassinate Prince William I of Orange. He was a Biscayan by his birth in Bilbao.

In 1582, he was in the service of a Spanish fur merchant, Gaspar de Añastro from Vitoria, who resided at Antwerp. De Añastro had lost three ships and was tempted by the supposed reward of 80,000 ducats and the habit of the Order of Santiago offered by Philip II of Spain for the assassination of William the Silent, prince of Orange, and being himself without courage to undertake the task, De Añastro (with the help of his cashier Antonio de Venero, a 19-year-old also from Bilbao, and the Dominican friar Antonio Timmerman, from Dunkirk) persuaded his poor accounting assistant Jáuregui to attempt the murder for the sum of 2877 crowns. Jáuregui had been convinced not only that heaven would smile on his attempt, but that he would become invisible immediately afterwards, and thus escape easily. 

On Sunday, March 18, 1582, as the prince came out of his dining-room, Jáuregui offered him a petition, and William had no sooner taken it into his hand than Jáuregui fired a pistol at his head. Although the pistol was badly designed and malfunctioned, one bullet pierced the neck below the right ear and passed out at the left jaw-bone, but William ultimately recovered. Jáuregui was pierced on the spot by the sword of a knight in the retinue and finally killed by the halberdiers.

Upon a search on the corpse, he was found to carry two pieces of castor fur, several crosses and amulets, a green wax candle (typical accoutrements of wizardry), and several papers written in Spanish.

When William recovered, he asked a merciful execution for the survivors: Venero and Timmerman were garotted on March 28, then decapitated and quartered for public exhibition.
De Añastro had left for Wallonia on March 13. He claimed the reward before Alessandro Farnese.
In this case, the reward was the 25,000 escudos, nobility title and pardon actually promised by Philip II in June 1580.

Although William suffered severe injuries, he survived thanks to the care of his wife Charlotte of Bourbon and his sister Mary. While William slowly recovered, Charlotte  died on May 5.

William was finally shot dead by the French Catholic Balthasar Gérard on 10 July 1584.

The case was published in French, Flemish and Spanish by Christopher Plantin as Bref recueil de l'assassinat, commis en la personne du Très Illustre Prince, Monseigneur le Prince d'Orange, Conte de Nassau, Marquis de la Vere, etc par Iean Iauregui Espaignol, Antwerp, 1582.

Among the published writings, there was a religious vouch promising donations to Jesus Christ, Our Lady of Begoña, Our Lady of Arantzazu, Our Lady of Guadalupe at Hondarribia, and the Christ of Burgos.
There also was a letter appealing to the goodwill of the Antwerpers.

Notes

References
 
 Sacra Némesis, Nuevas historias de nacionalistas vascos, Jon Juaristi, Espasa-Calpe, Madrid, 1999, pages 63–70, . Juaristi links Jáuregui's attack with ETA violence and the relationships of Catholicism with Basque nationalism.

Further reading
 Atentado en Amberes. La conspiración de vitorianos y bilbaínos contra el estatúder Guillermo de Orange, 1582. Julio-César Santoyo, Vitoria, Diputación Foral de Álava, 1982.
Lisa Jardine: The Awful End of William the Silent: The First Assassination of a Head of State with A Handgun: London: HarperCollins: 2005: 

1562 births
1582 deaths
1582 crimes
People from Bilbao
Failed regicides
Spanish people of the Eighty Years' War